Hari Jiwan Singh Khalsa is a prominent American Sikh.  He is Chief of Protocol for the American Sikh group called Sikh Dharma.

Early years
Khalsa (born Stephen Oxenhandler) was born September 29, 1942 in St. Louis, Missouri, to a well-to-do real estate development family. He was raised in a reformed Jewish community with whom he spent his youth between St. Louis and Palm Springs, California.

Career
In connection with one enterprise, Sweet Song Corporation, Khalsa and his associates were sued by the FTC for falsely representing the value of gemstone investments, and were subsequently barred from engaging in any business related to collectibles investments. In 2000, Hari Jiwan spent 18 months in federal prison for his involvement in the telemarketing scam.

References

American Sikhs
Living people
People from St. Louis
Year of birth missing (living people)